Boussac-Bourg is a commune in the Creuse department in the Nouvelle-Aquitaine region in central France.

Geography
The Petite Creuse river forms much of the southern border of the commune.

Population

Sights
 The two churches, built alongside each other: Notre-Dame and St. Martin, both dating from the eleventh century.
 A rural museum, housed in an old factory.

See also
Communes of the Creuse department

References

Communes of Creuse